Michael John Mahoney (born December 5, 1972) is a Major League Baseball catcher, formerly with the St. Louis Cardinals. He made his major league debut on September 8, 2000 with the Chicago Cubs, and after two seasons in Chicago, he was released and eventually signed with St. Louis.

References

External links

1972 births
Living people
Major League Baseball catchers
Chicago Cubs players
St. Louis Cardinals players
Creighton Bluejays baseball players
Baseball players from Des Moines, Iowa
American expatriate baseball players in Australia
Durham Bulls players
Eugene Emeralds players
Greenville Braves players
Memphis Redbirds players
Richmond Braves players
Syracuse SkyChiefs players
West Tennessee Diamond Jaxx players